Susanne Sabine Renner is a German botanist. She is professor of biology at the Ludwig Maximilian University of Munich as well as director of the Botanische Staatssammlung München and the Botanischer Garten München-Nymphenburg.

Education 
Renner received her M.Sc. degree in biology in 1980 and her Ph.D. in 1984, both from the University of Hamburg. She qualified as Professor in Systematic Botany in 1992.

Career
From 1987 to 1992 Renner was associate professor at the Botanical Institute at the University of Aarhus. From 1993 to 1996 she was Professor at the Johannes Gutenberg University Mainz. From 1996 to 2006 she was professor at the University of Missouri-St. Louis, affiliated with one of the largest botanical gardens worldwide, the Missouri Botanical Garden. Since 2003 she is professor for systematic botany at the Ludwig Maximilian University of Munich as well as director of the Botanische Staatssammlung München, the Botanischer Garten München-Nymphenburg and the University Herbarium (MSB). As of 2021, she retains an emeritus position at the University of Munich and is an honorary professor at Washington University in St. Louis.

Research 
Renner's research interests focus on the phylogenetics, mating system evolution, and biogeography of flowering plants, in both temperate and tropical regions. Renner's early research was on the phylogeny and reproductive biology of plants. She has also worked on dioecy and sex chromosomes in plants. The use of genetic tools enables Renner to track the movement of plants across ocean basins, define the separation of land masses following the breakup of Pangaea 153 million years ago, and define the origin of agricultural crops including cucumbers and melons and gourds. Renner's work on watermelons revealed that they originate from the northeast Africa in the Kordofan area and not South Africa as previously indicated. She has tracked the relationship between Philidris nagasau ants and Squamellaria plants over the past 3 million years, an interaction that is a type of farming because the ants place seeds into tree bark and then return later to eat the resulting growth. Her research followed the co-evolution between sword-billed hummingbirds and passion flowers, an interaction that has been gained and lost multiple times over the past 11 million years. In urban areas, her research on bees, how they collect pollen, and the role of flower strips in attracting bees is relevant given the impact of climate change on interactions between plants and insects.

Selected publications

Awards
Renner is a member of several notable science academies. In 1999, she was elected to the Bavarian Academy of Sciences and Humanities. In 2005 she was elected as a foreign member to the Royal Danish Academy of Sciences and Letters. In 2009 she was elect to Academy of Sciences Leopoldina in Germany. In 2018 she was elected to the American Academy of Arts and Sciences. In 2021, she was elected corresponding member of the Gesellschaft Naturforschender Freunde zu Berlin (founded in 1773).
From 2011-2020, she was President of the Bavarian Botanical Society.

Eponymy

Personal life 
Renner is married to American ornithologist and ecologist Robert Ricklefs.

References

External links 
 
  including extensive literature list.

20th-century German botanists
1954 births
Living people
Members of the German Academy of Sciences Leopoldina
21st-century German botanists
Scientists from Tübingen
German geneticists
Women botanists
University of Hamburg alumni
Academic staff of the Ludwig Maximilian University of Munich
University of Missouri–St. Louis faculty